Route 90 is a major north-south arterial route in Winnipeg, Manitoba, Canada. It begins at the South Perimeter Highway (PTH 100) and ends at the city's northwest limit, where it continues north as PTH 7. Route 90 is designated as the city's airport route, as it passes by Winnipeg James Armstrong Richardson International Airport.

Route description
Route 90 follows Kenaston Boulevard between the south Perimeter Highway and the Assiniboine River, through the suburbs of Waverley West, Fort Garry, and Tuxedo. North of the river, Route 90 enters St. James and follows Century Street to St. Matthews Avenue. Between St. Matthews and Dublin Avenues, it splits into separate one-way streets, with Century as the northbound and King Edward Street as the southbound. The route follows King Edward Street to the CP Carberry line underpass, after which Route 90 follows Oak Point Highway and later Brookside Boulevard before leaving the city and becoming PTH 7 approximately one kilometre south of the North Perimeter Highway (PTH 101).

History
Kenaston Boulevard
Kenaston Boulevard is named after E. C. Kenaston, who was responsible for the development of Tuxedo, one of the main suburbs that the street passes through. Until the 1980s, it was a minor road that extended south to Scurfield Boulevard and was primarily used to access the inland cement plant and quarries located near present-day Fort Whyte. In order to accommodate increased traffic and development in the area, Kenaston Boulevard was extended to Bishop Grandin Boulevard in the early 2000s and later all the way south to the Perimeter Highway in 2015.  Proposals currently exist to appropriate land former belonging the Canadian Armed Forces' Kapyong Barracks to widen the road between the rail crossing and the St. James Bridge. A separate proposal would see the route extended south of the Perimeter Highway to Highway 75, providing a western bypass of St. Norbert.

Oak Point Highway
Oak Point Highway in Winnipeg is an unattached remnant of an old road leading to Oak Point, Manitoba, which is now part of PTH 6.

Major intersections
From south to north; all intersections are at-grade unless otherwise indicated:

References

090
Tuxedo, Winnipeg
Fort Garry, Winnipeg
St. James, Winnipeg
Waverley West, Winnipeg